"Rampampam" is a song by Romanian singer and songwriter Minelli, released for digital download and streaming by Global Records on 18 March 2021 as a single. A house track, it was written by Minelli and produced by Viky Red. Lyrically, Minelli discusses a toxic relationship and the other partner's eventual revengeful feelings. Manuel Probst of Dance Charts gave the song a positive review upon release, praising its catchiness and Minelli's vocal delivery. 

Commercially, "Rampampam" topped the official rankings in Bulgaria, Czech Republic, Hungary, the Commonwealth of Independent States (CIS), Lithuania and Russia. The song has been further certified double platinum by the Polish Society of the Phonographic Industry (ZPAV). To promote "Rampampam", an accompanying music video was uploaded to the singer's YouTube channel simultaneously with the single's digital release. Directed by Kobzzon, it portrays Minelli and two other women pouring gasoline on a car which features a man trapped inside. The singer further performed the song on Romanian and Bulgarian radio stations throughout May and June 2021, respectively.

Background and composition
Minelli, born Luisa Luca, is a Romanian singer, composer and songwriter signed to Global Records. In 2006, at the age of 16, she was part of the native girl band Wassabi formed by Marius Moga. Upon their disbandment, Minelli pursued a solo career, contributing features to LoL Deejays and Follow Your Instinct's "Portillia de bobo" (2013) and Dave Ramone's "Love On Repeat" (2016), which reached modest chart peaks in France and Germany, respectively. "Empty Spaces" (2017) eventually secured her a record deal with Ultra Records, and "Addicted" (2019) with Sickotoy and "Mariola" (2019) climbed to respective peaks of numbers two and one on the Romanian Airplay 100 ranking. As a songwriter, Minelli's portfolio includes songs such as Inna's "Flashbacks" (2021), which achieved success in Eastern Europe. 

"Rampampam", a house track with slap house-inspired basslines, was composed by its songwriter Minelli and producer Viky Red. Minelli came up with the hook in around five minutes after Viky Red had presented her an instrumental. She went on to utilize the term "rampampam" in the lyrics, which is used to compare being hurt by a lover to shooting a gun. Overall, the track discusses a toxic relationship that ends in revenge. Minelli further stated about the song's meaning and her collaboration with Viky Red: "I think ["Rampampam"] brings a dose of courage and strength, even if the main theme is a relationship that has caused injuries. Every time I work with Viky Red the result is one that delights me, as well this time".

Release and reception
"Rampampam" was first released as a single for digital download and streaming in Romania and Russia by Global Records on 18 March 2021. Two days later, the song was sent to Romanian radio stations. "Rampampam" was subsequently issued in various other territories on 18 June 2021 by Warner Music Poland, with alternative versions having also been made available, including a partly French language one. Seven of the several remixes created for "Rampampam" are featured on a remix EP distributed by Spinnin' Records. Upon release, Manuel Probst, writing for the German website Dance Charts, gave the song a positive review, concentrating his praise on the track's catchiness and Minelli's vocals. After having trended on several Shazam and Spotify charts worldwide, "Rampampam" topped the official rankings in Bulgaria, Czech Republic, Hungary, the Commonwealth of Independent States (CIS), Lithuania and Russia, while peaking at number two on charts in native Romania, Poland and Ukraine. On the week ending 28 August 2021, "Rampampam" reached number 139 on Billboard Global Excl. U.S. chart. The song has been certified triple platinum by the Polish Society of the Phonographic Industry (ZPAV) in September 2022 for moving 150,000 units.

Music video and promotion
An accompanying music video was uploaded to Minelli's YouTube channel on 18 March 2021. On 23 March 2021, the visual was sent to Romanian television channels. It was directed by Kobzzon, while Paul Tatcu served as the director of photography. The clip is centered around the revengeful lyrical content of the song, portraying Minelli and two other women in a dark room, pouring gasoline over a car which features a man locked inside. Interspersed scenes feature the singer surrounded by black balloons and sitting on a red chair, watching footage of the aforementioned man on an oversized display. The music video ends with Minelli holding a lighter in front of the car, suggesting her desire of setting it on fire. For further promotion of "Rampampam", the #DoTheRampampam challenge was introduced on TikTok in June 2021, yielding in more than 2,000 videos being created. Minelli performed the song live on several occasions, beginning with the Romanian radio stations Kiss FM and Pro FM on 9 and 24 May 2021, respectively. On 9 June 2021, the singer also made appearances to sing the track for the Bulgarian radios The Voice and NRJ.

Track listing
Digital download
"Rampampam" – 3:20

Digital download (Alternative versions)

"Rampampam" (French Version) – 3:18
"Rampampam" (BTTN Remix) – 2:55
"Rampampam" (DaWho Remix) – 3:17
"Rampampam" (DJ Dark and Mentol Remix) – 3:24
"Rampampam" (Ferki Remix) – 3:10
"Rampampam" (Filatov & Karas Remix) – 2:32
"Rampampam" (Get Better Remix) – 4:29
"Rampampam" (Hayasa G and Kazu Remix) – 3:07
"Rampampam" (Kean Dysso Remix) – 3:18
"Rampampam" (NALYRO Remix) – 3:10
"Rampampam" (Robert Cristian Remix) – 3:00
"Rampampam" (Vadim Adamov and Hardphol Remix) – 3:37
"Rampampam" (Vize and Averro Remix) – 2:46
"Rampampam" (Wh0 Remix) – 3:23
"Rampampam" (Partywithray Remix) – 3:23

Charts

Weekly charts

Monthly charts

Year-end charts

Certifications

Release history

See also
List of Media Forest most-broadcast songs of the 2020s in Romania
List of number-one songs of the 2020s (Czech Republic)
List of number-one singles of the 2020s (Hungary)

References

Number-one singles in Russia
English-language Romanian songs
2021 songs
2021 singles
Number-one singles in the Commonwealth of Independent States
Number-one singles in Hungary